Saros cycle series 114 for lunar eclipses occurs at the moon's ascending node, 18 years 11 and 1/3 days. It contains 71 member events, with 13 total eclipses, starting in 1458 and ending in 1674. Solar saros 121 interleaves with this lunar saros with an event occurring every 9 years 5 days alternating between each saros series.

This lunar saros is linked to Solar Saros 121.

Summary
Lunar Saros series 114, repeating every 18 years and 11 days, has a total of 71 lunar eclipse events including 13 total lunar eclipses.

First Penumbral Lunar Eclipse: 0971 May 13

First Partial Lunar Eclipse: 1115 Aug 07

First Total Lunar Eclipse: 1458 Feb 28

First Central Lunar Eclipse: 1530 Apr 12

Greatest Eclipse of Lunar Saros 114: 1584 May 24 where totality lasted 106 minutes.

Last Central Lunar Eclipse: 1638 Jun 26

Last Total Lunar Eclipse: 1674 Jul 17

Last Partial Lunar Eclipse: 1890 Nov 26

Last Penumbral Lunar Eclipse: 2233 Jun 22

List

See also 
 List of lunar eclipses
 List of Saros series for lunar eclipses

Notes

External links 
 www.hermit.org: Saros 114

Lunar saros series